Daniel Anthony may refer to:
Daniel Anthony (actor) (born 1987), British actor
Daniel Read Anthony, Jr. (1870–1931), American Republican politician
Daniel Read Anthony (1824–1904), American publisher and abolitionist; father to Daniel Read Anthony, Jr

See also
Dan Anthony, American recording artist, songwriter and musician